Ajoo (Born Noh Ah-joo, ( on July 6, 1990) is a South Korean singer who debuted in 2008 with the single "1st Kiss".

Although his first single did not do as well as expected on music charts he made a comeback with "Paparazzi" which features labelmate and popular female solo artist Younha. Younha also wrote the lyrics for the song and appeared in the music video.

He released a single in early 2009 titled "" ("Wealthy 2nd Generation"), which deals with the topic of rich, spoiled children.  The song was banned in its original state from KBS, saying that the song was encouraging excessive, indulgent lifestyles; this was criticized by the public, saying that KBS's own dramas were guilty of the same thing, namely its hit Boys Over Flowers.

In 2010 he starred in a Thai film Kaorak thi kaoli Sorry saranghaeyo by Poj Arnon, as himself.

Discography

References

1990 births
K-pop singers
Living people
South Korean pop singers
South Korean male film actors
21st-century South Korean male  singers